This is a detailed results of 2004 general election by individual constituents in Tamil Nadu.

Results by party

Results by party

Results by constituency

Chennai North
 Note: Dravida Munnetra Kazhagam, Marumalarchi Dravida Munnetra Kazhagam, Pattali Makkal Katchi were all part of the National Democratic Alliance, in 1999, but joined the United Progressive Alliance in 2004.  So the coalition switches, represent the change in coalition from the 1999 election to 2004 election.

 
 
 

 
 
 

 
 
 

 
 
 

 
 
 

 
 
 

Note: The incumbent party DMK did not contest this seat in 2004. Instead it was contested by its United Progressive Alliance coalition partner PMK, who won the seat. Thus, the UPA held the seat. PMK had not contested this seat in the previous 1999 elections.

 
 
 

Note: The incumbent party PMK did not contest this seat in 2004. Instead it was contested by its United Progressive Alliance coalition partner DMK, who won the seat. Thus, the UPA held the seat. DMK had not contested this seat in the previous 1999 elections.

 
 
 

 
 
 

Note: The incumbent party PMK did not contest this seat in 2004. Instead it was contested by its United Progressive Alliance coalition partner MDMK, who won the seat. Thus, the UPA held the seat. MDMK had not contested this seat in the previous 1999 elections.

 
 
 

Note: The incumbent party MDMK did not contest this seat in 2004. Instead it was contested by its United Progressive Alliance coalition partner PMK, who won the seat. Thus, the UPA held the seat. PMK had not contested this seat in the previous 1999 elections.

 
 
 

 
 
 

 
 
 

 
 
 

 
 
 

Note: AIADMK, was not part of a coalition, in 1999 election, hence it is a gain for UPA.

 
 
 

Note: AIADMK, was not part of a coalition, in 1999 election, hence it is a gain for UPA.

 
 
 

Note: The incumbent party MDMK did not contest this seat in 2004. Instead it was contested by its United Progressive Alliance coalition partner DMK, who won the seat. Thus, the UPA held the seat. DMK had not contested this seat in the previous 1999 elections.

 
 
 

 
 
 

Note: AIADMK, was not part of a coalition, in 1999 election, hence it is a gain for UPA.

 
 
 

 
 
 

 
 
 

Note: AIADMK, was not part of a coalition, in 1999 election, hence it is a gain for UPA.

 
 
 

Note: AIADMK, was not part of a coalition, in 1999 election, hence it is a gain for UPA.

 
 
 

 
 
 

Note: AIADMK, was not part of a coalition, in 1999 election, hence it is a gain for UPA.

 
 
 

Note: AIADMK, was not part of a coalition, in 1999 election, hence it is a gain for UPA.

 
 
 

 
 
 

 
 
 

 
 
 

 
 
 

 
 
 

Note: The incumbent party MADMK did not contest this seat in 2004. Instead it was contested by its coalition partner from the previous 1999 elections - DMK. Also, this is a gain for the UPA, since MADMK, the incumbent was part of the NDA coalition, while DMK left the NDA for UPA

 
 
 

 
 
 

Note: AIADMK, was not part of a coalition, in 1999 election, hence it is a gain for UPA.

 
 
 

 
 
 

Note: AIADMK, was not part of a coalition, in 1999 election, hence it is a gain for UPA.

References 

Tamil Nadu, Results
Indian general elections in Tamil Nadu
2000s in Tamil Nadu
Results of general elections in India